Hans Nicolai Andersen (born 1 November 1974 in Hillerød) is a Danish politician, who is a member of the Folketing for the Venstre political party. He was elected into parliament at the 2011 Danish general election. He was previously a member of parliament between 2001 and 2007.

Political career
Andersen first ran for parliament in the 2001 Danish general election, where he was elected with 2,684 personal votes. He was reelected in the 2005 election with 2,979 personal votes. He ran again in the 2007 election, but was not reelected. He returned to parliament after the 2011 election, with 1,333 personal votes, and was reelected in 2015 with 5,447 votes and in 2019 with 7,444 votes. He was reelected again in 2022 with 4,031 votes.

External links 
 Biography on the website of the Danish Parliament (Folketinget)

References 

Living people
1974 births
People from Hillerød Municipality
Venstre (Denmark) politicians
Members of the Folketing 2001–2005
Members of the Folketing 2005–2007
Members of the Folketing 2011–2015
Members of the Folketing 2015–2019
Members of the Folketing 2019–2022
Members of the Folketing 2022–2026